The canton of Bagneux is a French administrative division, located in the arrondissement of Antony, in the Hauts-de-Seine département (Île-de-France région). Its borders were modified at the French canton reorganisation which came into effect in March 2015. Its seat is in Bagneux.

Composition 
The canton consists of the following communes:
 Bagneux
 Bourg-la-Reine

Adjacent cantons 
 Canton of Montrouge (north)
 Canton of Châtillon (west)
 Canton of Châtenay-Malabry (southwest)
 Canton of Antony (south)

See also
Cantons of the Hauts-de-Seine department
Communes of the Hauts-de-Seine department

References

Bagneux